Castle Stuart Platform was a railway station located near Castle Stuart, to the east of Inverness, now in Highland council area. Opened in 1855 to serve Castle Stuart, the ancestral home of the Earls of Moray, it wasn't listed in public timetables and closed 1938.  The structure was still extant as late as 1951, but no trace of it now remains.

References

External links
RAILSCOT on Inverness and Nairn Railway

Disused railway stations in Highland (council area)
Railway stations in Great Britain opened in 1855
Railway stations in Great Britain closed in 1938
1854 establishments in Scotland